Olkhovka is a rural locality (a village) in Nikolayevsky Selsoviet, Tuymazinsky District, Bashkortostan, Russia. The population was 8 as of 2010. There is 1 street.

Geography 
Olkhovka is located 21 km south of Tuymazy (the district's administrative centre) by road. Samsykovo is the nearest rural locality.

References 

Rural localities in Tuymazinsky District